Ooni Omogbogbo was the 28th Ooni of Ife, a paramount traditional ruler of Ile Ife, the ancestral home of the Yorubas. He succeeded Ooni Ademilu and was succeeded by  
Ooni Ajila Oorun.

References

Oonis of Ife
Yoruba history